Medve is a Hungarian surname derived from Medveczky. Notable people with the surname include:

 Tracy Medve, Canadian airline executive

See also
Medved (surname)

Hungarian-language surnames